The 1980 Milan–San Remo was the 71st edition of the Milan–San Remo cycle race and was held on 16 March 1980. The race started in Milan and finished in San Remo. The race was won by Pierino Gavazzi of the Magniflex team.

General classification

References

1980
March 1980 sports events in Europe
1980 in road cycling
1980 in Italian sport
1980 Super Prestige Pernod